Carcagno is a surname. Notable people with the surname include:

Jorge Carcagno (1917–1983), Argentinean general
Simon Carcagno (born 1976), American rower
Megan Cooke Carcagno (born 1980), American rower